Protogoniomorpha temora, the blue mother-of-pearl or eastern blue beauty, is a butterfly in the family Nymphalidae. It is found in Nigeria, Cameroon, the Republic of the Congo, Angola, the Central African Republic, the Democratic Republic of the Congo, Uganda, Tanzania, Kenya, Sudan and Ethiopia. The habitat consists of dense forests and riverine thicket.

The larvae feed on Paulowilhelmia sclerochiton, Mimulopsis spatulata, Sclerochiton paulowilhelmina, Justicia, Asystasia and Mellera species.

Subspecies
Protogoniomorpha temora temora (Nigeria, Cameroon, Congo, Angola, Central African Republic, Democratic Republic of the Congo, Uganda, western Tanzania, western Kenya, southern Sudan, Ethiopia)
Protogoniomorpha temora virescens (Suffert, 1904) (Tanzania: east to the Nguru and Uluguru Mountains)

References

Butterflies described in 1867
Junoniini
Butterflies of Africa
Taxa named by Baron Cajetan von Felder
Taxa named by Rudolf Felder